St Austell Rural District was a local government division of Cornwall in England, UK, between 1894 and 1974. Established under the Local Government Act 1894, the rural district was reduced to create Fowey Municipal Borough in 1913 and enlarged by the abolition of Bodmin Rural District and St Columb Major Rural District in 1934 and Lostwithiel Municipal Borough in 1968.

In 1974 the district was abolished under the Local Government Act 1972, forming part of the new Restormel district.

Civil parishes
The civil parishes within the district were:
 Colan
 Grampound with Creed
 Lanlivery
 Lostwithiel
 Luxulyan
 Mawgan in Pydar
 Roche
 St Columb Major
 St Dennis
 St Enoder
 St Ewe
 St Goran
 St Mewan
 St Michael Caerhays
 St Sampson
 St Stephen in Brannel
 St Wenn

References

Districts of England created by the Local Government Act 1894
Districts of England abolished by the Local Government Act 1972
Rural districts of England
Local government in Cornwall
History of Cornwall
St Austell